Yves Jean Bonnefoy (24 June 1923, Tours – 1 July 2016 Paris) was a French poet and art historian. He also published a number of translations, most notably the plays of William Shakespeare which are considered among the best in French. He was professor at the Collège de France from 1981 to 1993 and is the author of several works on art, art history, and artists including Miró and Giacometti, and a monograph on Paris-based Iranian artist Farhad Ostovani. The Encyclopædia Britannica states that Bonnefoy was ″perhaps the most important French poet of the latter half of the 20th century.″

Life and career
Bonnefoy was born in Tours, Indre-et-Loire, the son of Marius Elie Bonnefoy, a railroad worker, and Hélène Maury, a teacher. He studied mathematics and philosophy at the Universities of Poitiers and the Sorbonne in Paris. After the Second World War he travelled in Europe and the United States and studied art history. From 1945 to 1947 he was associated with the Surrealists in Paris (a short-lived influence that is at its strongest in his first published work, Traité du pianiste (1946)). But it was with the highly personal  (On the Motion and Immobility of Douve, 1953) that Bonnefoy found his voice and that his name first came to public notice. Bonnefoy's style is remarkable for the deceptive simplicity of its vocabulary.

Bonnefoy's work has been translated into English by, among others, Emily Grosholz, Galway Kinnell, John Naughton, Alan Baker, Hoyt Rogers, Antony Rudolf, Beverley Bie Brahic and Richard Stamelmann. In 1967 he joined with André du Bouchet, Gaëtan Picon, and Louis-René des Forêts to found L'éphémère, a journal of art and literature. Commenting on his work, Bonnefoy has said:

He taught literature at a number of universities in Europe and in the USA: Brandeis University, Waltham, Massachusetts (1962–64); Centre Universitaire, Vincennes (1969–1970); Johns Hopkins University, Baltimore; Princeton University, New Jersey; University of Connecticut, Storrs, Connecticut;Yale University, New Haven, Connecticut; University of Geneva; University of Nice (1973–1976); University of Provence, Aix (1979–1981); and Graduate Center, City University of New York, where he was made an honorary member of the Academy of the Humanities and Sciences. In 1981, following the death of Roland Barthes, he was given the chair of comparative study of poetry at the Collège de France.

Bonnefoy continued to work closely with painters throughout his career and wrote prefaces for artists’ books, including those by his friend Miklos Bokor.

Bonnefoy died on 1 July 2016 at the age of 93 in Paris. President François Hollande stated of Bonnefoy on his death that he would be remembered for "elevating our language to its supreme degree of precision and beauty".

Awards and honours
Bonnefoy was honoured with a number of prizes throughout his creative life. Early on he was awarded the Prix des Critiques in 1971. Ten years later, in 1981, The French Academy gave him its grand prize, which was soon followed by the Goncourt Prize for Poetry in 1987. Over the next 15 years, Bonnefoy was awarded both the Prix mondial Cino Del Duca and the Balzan Prize (for Art History and Art Criticism in Europe) in 1995, the Golden Wreath of Struga Poetry Evenings in 1999, and the Grand Prize of the First Masaoka Shiki International Haiku Awards in 2000. Toward the final years of his life, Bonnefoy was recognized with the Franz Kafka Prize in 2007 and, in 2011, he received the Griffin Lifetime Recognition Award, presented by the trustees of the Griffin Poetry Prize. In 2014, he was co-winner of the Janus Pannonius International Poetry Prize. He won the 2015 International Nonino Prize in Italy.

Selected works in English translation
1968: On the Motion and Immobility of Douve. Translated by Galway Kinnell. (Ohio University Press: ASIN: B000ILHLXA) – poetry
1985: Poems: 1959-1975. Translated by Richard Pevear. – poetry
1991: In the Shadow's Light. Translated by John Naughton. (University of Chicago Press: 9780226064482) – poetry
1991: Mythologies [2 Volumes]. Compiled by Yves Bonnefoy. Edited by Wendy Doniger. (University of Chicago Press) 
1993: Alberto Giacometti: A Biography of His Work. – art criticism
1995: The Lure and the Truth of Painting: Selected Essays on Art. (University of Chicago Press) – art criticism 
2004: Shakespeare and the French Poet. – essays on the role of the translator. (University of Chicago Press)
2007: The Curved Planks. Translated by Hoyt Rogers. (Farrar,). – poetry
2011: Second Simplicity: New Poetry and Prose, 1991-2011. Selected, translated, and with an introduction by Hoyt Rogers.. – poetry
2012: Beginning and End of the Snow [followed by Where the Arrow Falls]. Translated by Emily Grosholz. – poetry 
2013: The Present Hour; with an Introduction by Beverley Bie Brahic. – poetry
2014: The Digamma; with an introduction by Hoyt Rogers. Translated by Hoyt Rogers.. – poetry
2015: The Anchor's Long Chain; with an Introduction by Beverley Bie Brahic. – includes both poems and short stories
2017: Together Still [followed by Perambulans in Noctem]; with an afterword by Hoyt Rogers. Translated by Hoyt Rogers with Mathilde Bonnefoy.. – poetry

Notes

References

External links

 
 French Poetry since 1950: Tendencies I, by Jean-Michel Maulpoix, translated by Catherine Wieder
 Griffin Lifetime Recognition Award 2011 tribute (including video) 
 CUNY Academy for the Humanities and Sciences
Laurea Honoris Causa, Teoria e Prassi della Traduzione, Università di Napoli "L'Orientale" (video)
 A Memorial Dossier honoring Yves Bonnefoy with contributions from Hoyt Rogers and Anthony Rudolf

1923 births
2016 deaths
Artists from Tours, France
20th-century French poets
University of Poitiers alumni
University of Paris alumni
Brandeis University faculty
Johns Hopkins University faculty
Yale University faculty
Princeton University faculty
Academic staff of Côte d'Azur University
Academic staff of the Collège de France
Academic staff of the University of Geneva
City University of New York faculty
The New Yorker people
Prix Goncourt de la Poésie winners
Struga Poetry Evenings Golden Wreath laureates
Academic staff of the University of Provence
Fellows of the American Academy of Arts and Sciences
21st-century French poets
21st-century French male writers
French male poets
Translators of William Shakespeare